Philanthaxia pseudoaenea is a species of beetle that was discovered in Thailand on July, 2011.

References

Beetles described in 2011
Buprestidae
Woodboring beetles